Wideman is an unincorporated community in Izard County, Arkansas, United States. Wideman has a post office with ZIP code 72585.

It is within the Calico Rock School District.

References

Unincorporated communities in Izard County, Arkansas
Unincorporated communities in Arkansas